Club Car is an American company that manufactures electric and gas-powered golf carts and small utility vehicles for personal and commercial use. It is currently owned by Platinum Equity after being acquired in 2021. Before that, the company was a business unit of the Ingersoll Rand corporation in its Industrial Technologies division. It is one of the largest employers in Columbia County, Georgia.

History
Originally established in 1958 in Houston, Texas as Landreath Machine, Club Car was purchased by Bill Stevens, Jr., renamed, and moved to Augusta, Georgia in 1962 where its primary headquarters reside.

A group of eight executives from EZGO purchased the company in 1978 to begin running their own business, establishing Club Car as an in-town rival in the golf cart industry. One of the first Club Car executives was EZGO cofounder William Dolan.

It was acquired by Ingersoll Rand in 1995 as part of the company's Infrastructure division, but was merged with Bobcat to create a new Compact Vehicles Technology division aimed at producing utility vehicles in addition to golf cars.

In 2021, Platinum Equity acquired Club Car in an all-cash transaction valued at $1.68 billion.

Products
Club Car produces vehicles for personal use, business and commercial applications, and golf operations.

Personal Utility Vehicles (UTVs)

Beginning in 2007, Club Car entered into the utility vehicles (UTV) market with its XRT line of personal utility vehicles. These ranged from the XRT800 4x2 UTV to XRT1550 4x4 UTV with the ability to add work attachments to the vehicle. Club Car also offers street-legal golf carts with automotive features such as seat belts, turn signals, windshields, and more. The utility line was expanded two years later to include more vehicle options.

Commercial Utility Vehicles (UTVs)

Club Car first began offering UTVs for golf courses by modifying golf carts with holding boxes and other accessories for increased application. They created vehicles targeted at business applications in 1985 with its Carryall II aimed at manufacturing facilities, college campuses, and providing a turf utility vehicle for golf course operations. It became the Carryall series as the company continued producing more vehicle options.

In 2014, the company re-launched its line of commercial utility vehicles with a reintroduction of the Carryall series boasting improved efficiency, a new line of accessories, and two new types of vehicles: street-legal low-speed vehicles (LSV) and vehicles designed for transporting multiple people at resorts, venues, and campuses.

Golf Carts

Club Car’s first product was a three-wheeled golf carts introduced in 1958. The company has continued making carts since.

The company is regarded as an industry leader involved in many innovations, including producing one of the first street-legal golf carts. It enjoyed newfound success with its DS line of golf cart beginning in 1980. The cart, named after designer Dom Saporito, became the company's hallmark until 2004, when the Precedent line of carts were introduced. The company revealed its next version, the Precedent i2, to critical acclaim, and again in 2008 in an all-new drive system.

The company's partnership with GPSI in 2015 produced the world's first connected golf cart  in the Precedent i3, featuring one system to connect an entire golf fleet to the clubhouse and providing new options like score tracking to the golfer. The Precedent i2, i3, and 4Fun are sold to and used by golf courses, while the i2 is also available for personal use.

In 2017, the company launched the first of its Onward series of personal transportation vehicles, introducing the ability to customize a vehicle's accessories, color, and more online for the first time. A 2-passenger, 4 passenger, and 4 passenger lifted vehicle were featured in the initial launch, with a 6-passenger and lithium-ion option added later.

References

External links

Official website

Vehicle manufacturing companies established in 1958
Companies based in Augusta, Georgia
Ingersoll Rand
1958 establishments in Georgia (U.S. state)
American corporate subsidiaries
2021 mergers and acquisitions